Cecily of Sweden - Swedish: Cecilia - may refer to:

Cecilia Johansdotter of Sweden, Queen consort of Sweden 1167 - name uncertain 
Princess Cecilia of Sweden, Princess of Sweden 1540, Duchess consort of Baden by marriage
Princess Cecilia of Sweden (1807–1844), Princess of Sweden 1807, Grand Duchess consort of Oldenburg by marriage